Julia M. Riley (née Hill) is a British astrophysicist who developed the Fanaroff–Riley classification.

Personal and professional background 
She is the daughter of Philippa (born Pass) and British marine geophysicist Maurice Hill and granddaughter of Nobel Prize–winning physiologist Archibald Vivian Hill.
Riley is a Fellow of Girton College associated with the Cavendish Astrophysics Group at University of Cambridge. Her primary field of research is in the area of radio astronomy. Riley lectures and supervises physics within the Natural Sciences Tripos at the University of Cambridge.

Fanaroff–Riley type I and II 
In 1974, along with Fanaroff, she wrote a paper classifying radio galaxies into two types based on their morphology (shape). Fanaroff and Riley's classification became known as Fanaroff–Riley type I and II of radio galaxies (FRI and FRII). In FRI sources the major part of the radio emission comes from closer to the centre of the source, whereas in FRII sources the major part of the emission comes from hotspots set away from the centre (see active galaxies).

References

External links
Webpage at Girton College
Webpage at Cavendish Astrophysics Group

21st-century British astronomers
Fellows of Girton College, Cambridge
Living people
Keynes family
Women astronomers
British women scientists
Academics of the University of Cambridge
Year of birth missing (living people)
20th-century British astronomers